The Ankililoaka mine is one of the largest titanium mines in Madagascar. The mine is located in Melaky. The mine has reserves amounting to 368 million tonnes of ore grading 6% titanium.

References 

Titanium mines in Madagascar